Patrick Schulze (born 2 January 1973) is a German sprint canoer who competed in the late 1990s. He won two bronze medals at the ICF Canoe Sprint World Championships, earning them in the C-2 1000 m (1999) and C-4 1000 m (1995) events.

Schulze also finished fourth in the C-1 1000 m event at the 1996 Summer Olympics in Atlanta.

References

Sports-reference.com profile

1973 births
Canoeists at the 1996 Summer Olympics
German male canoeists
Living people
Olympic canoeists of Germany
ICF Canoe Sprint World Championships medalists in Canadian